Cichowo may refer to the following places in Poland:
 Cichowo, Greater Poland Voivodeship, village in the administrative district of Gmina Krzywiń, within Kościan County, Greater Poland Voivodeship
 Cichowo, Masovian Voivodeship, village in the administrative district of Gmina Krzynowłoga Mała, within Przasnysz County, Masovian Voivodeship